New Rickstones Academy (NRA) is an academy secondary school in Witham, Essex. It is the smaller of the two major comprehensive schools in Witham.

During 2012 the school moved into a new building, constructed by Carillion.   An Ofsted inspection took place on 17 and 18 January 2013. The school is sponsored by the Academies Enterprise Trust.

During 2015, the school received  a "Good" in its Ofsted report.

The school has undergone some changes to the girls uniform in the summer of 2019, focusing on skirts. The skirts have been changed into kilt-like dresses with checkered patterns embroidered onto them. Girls at New Rickstones Academy still have the option to wear trousers If preferred.

New Rickstones Academy is oversubscribed.

See also 
List of schools in Essex

References

External links 
School website

Academies in Essex
Secondary schools in Essex
Academies Enterprise Trust